Sanagi Tangbal (English: Golden Throne) is a 2014 Indian Meitei language film directed by Bijgupta Laishram, produced by Bordini and presented by Sania. It stars Gokul Athokpam and Bala Hijam in the lead roles. The story of the film was written by Bordini, and screenplay by Bijgupta Laishram. The film was premiered at Bhagyachandra Open Air Theatre (BOAT) on 29 April 2014. It was later released in different theatres of Manipur including Pratap Talkies, and the film was a 2014 hit Manipuri film.

Synopsis
Lingjelthoibi is a hard working college student, who is brought up in a well-to-do family. Her life takes a sharp turn when she is kidnapped by a guy who is working for them. In spite of his irrational actions, she started feeling sympathy for his family. She stands for them. She begins to live in the poor family. She is allowed to continue her study. All the members of the family work hard to support the family and her study. Finally, she became a successful person. On the other hand, Lingjelthoibi's family (parental) falls because of her brothers' unfair means of livelihood. They are doing business of all kind which are popular from time to time. It includes drug and animal trafficking.

Cast
 Gokul Athokpam as Thoungamba
 Bala Hijam as Lingjelthoibi
 Surjit Saikhom as Laingam, Lingjelthoibi's brother
 Sunil Myboy as Kaoba, Lingjelthoibi's brother
 Khekman Ratan as Subol, Lingjelthoibi's brother
 Ashok Seleibam as Lingjelthoibi's brother
 Sanjoy as Bobo, Lingjelthoibi's brother
 SP Ingocha Yanglem as Superintendent of Police
 Idhou as Lingjelthoibi's father
 Thongam Thoithoi as Lingjelthoibi's mother
 Ghanashyam as Home Minister, Lingjelthoibi's uncle
 Irom Shyamkishore as Kunjo, Thoungamba's father
 Wangkhem Lalitkumar as Thoungamba's local guardian
 Longjam Ongbi Lalitabi as Kunjo's wife
 R.K. Hemabati as High Court judge
 Samjetsabam Mangoljao as Judge
 Narendra Ningomba as Judge
 Oken Thoudam as Police

Accolades
Idhou (Chakpram Rameshchandra) won the Best Actor in a Supporting Role - Male at the 9th Manipur State Film Awards 2014. The citation for the award reads, "For his versatility on presenting a range of expression on responding to varied senses and emotions of a father overly concerned with material possessions and power rather than valuing humane essence."

Reception
khonjel.org wrote, "Bala is the centre of this story. Her presentation is really nice. However, when it comes to personify an officer, she needs to work out a bit more. I will rate this movie 6.3 out of 10. This movie encourages the viewers to dream big. It also shows the present scenario of Manipur law and order dilemma."

Soundtrack
Sorri Senjam composed the soundtrack for the film and Bijgupta Laishram wrote the lyrics. The songs are titled Achikpa Ahinggi Chiklaba Thabalda and Lonna Kana Khanghandana.

References

2010s Meitei-language films
2014 films